Houdain-lez-Bavay (literally Houdain near Bavay) is a commune in the Nord department in northern France.

Heraldry

See also
Communes of the Nord department

References

Houdainlezbavay